Lakaica is a village in Municipality of Struga, North Macedonia.

References

Villages in Struga Municipality